Yaohua High School is a key school directly under the Tianjin Municipal Committee of Education, in the People's Republic of China.

Introduction 
The school is located on 106, Nanjing Road, Heping District, Tianjin. The first four buildings are built during the concession period with British style, then a new building has been added during the 90s while the latest development of the school has included several building complexes that has been accomplished around 2004–2005.  It originally covered 35,000 square metres, and recently an area of over 20,000 square metres adjoining to it has been added. Its original floor space was 25,600 square metres. Some new buildings to be built will add an additional 39,000 square metres. The school buildings have an attractive combination of Chinese and Western styles. At the center of the campus is the school library with a collection of 120,000 books,  the Science Building is well equipped and the computer center has Internet access, there is also an astronomical observatory.
There are additional recreational facilities for both teachers and students, such as two fully equipped gymnasia, several basketball courts, one standard football field with a 400-metre track surrounding it, a swimming pool, a canteen and a dining hall that can serve 600 people at a time. There is also an auditorium, which can hold 1,380 people.

Yaohua High School has a long history, and fosters an honest and simple school spirit and aims to be a  cradle of talents. Its history can be traced back to the early 20th century. In 1927, Mr. Zhuang Lefeng, one of the directors of the Union of the Chinese Taxpayers in the British Concession in Tianjin, founded the Tianjin Public School in the British Concession to benefit Chinese children. In 1934 it was renamed as Yaohua School which means "to glorify China". In 1952 the name was changed to Tianjin No.16 Middle School and then reverted to Tianjin Yaohua High School in 1988. In the past 70-odd years, both teachers and students in Yaohua have aspired to keep to the school motto: "Diligence, Simplicity, Loyalty and Honesty".

Since its foundation, the school has trained over 30,000 graduates. Famous alumni include:

 Science, Engineering and academia:
 Hao Yichun an academician of Chinese Academy of Sciences;
 Liang Sili an academician of Chinese Academy of Sciences;
 Zhu Qihe an academician of Chinese Academy of Sciences;
 Yu Min an academician of Chinese Academy of Sciences;
 Wang Kui an academician of Chinese Academy of Sciences;
 Zhou Yaohe an academician of Chinese Academy of Sciences;
 Sun Jiazhong an academician of Chinese Academy of Sciences;
 Feng Shizuo an academician of Chinese Academy of Sciences;
 Wang Yue an academician of both Chinese Academy of Sciences and Chinese Academy of Engineering;
 Zhang Jinzhe an academician of Chinese Academy of Engineering;
 Jin Yilian an academician of Chinese Academy of Engineering;
 Wang Jingkang an academician of Chinese Academy of Engineering;
 Zhu Chuangju(Jeffrey Chuan Chu) a world-famous computer specialist who was involved in the manufacturing of the world's first electronic computer;
 Wang Lei the former vice-president of the General Hospital of the Chinese navy;
 Chen Keqian the former president of Suzhou University;
 Fang Huijian the former vice-president and the leader of the branch committee of the Chinese Communist Party (CCP) of Tsinghua University;
 Hou Zixin president of Nankai University.
 Wu Xi academician at Duke University
 Politics:
 Zhou Nan vice-premier of the Ministry of Foreign Affairs and the former chief of Hong Kong Branch of Xinhua News Agency;
 Zheng Bijian vice-president of CCP Central Propaganda Department and the Central Party School;
 Nie Bichu the former mayor and the Director of Standing Committee of the People's Congress of Tianjin;
 Yu Fujing the former deputy mayor and the deputy director of Standing Committee of the People's Congress of Tianjin;
 Chenli Wanruo (Lily Lee Chen) the present director of the Research Centre on Cultures between the East and the West and the former mayor of a city in California, USA (the first Chinese female mayor in American history).
 Literature and the Arts:
 Wang Qian a famous calligrapher and the deputy director of the Chinese Calligraphers' Association;
 Chen Xianglong a famous calligrapher and painter
 Han Wenlai a famous calligrapher and painter;
 Jiang Dawei a well-known vocalist;
 Liu Huan a well-known singer.

Each year, over 500 graduates from Yaohua go on to colleges and universities, which are more than any other school in Tianjin. In 2000 and 2001, all Yaohua High School graduates were admitted to universities, of which 97% were top-ranked ones.

From 1998 to 2000, students from the school continuously won first place in science subjects in the National Entrance Examination in Tianjin, especially in 2000, when Yaohua students took the top four places in science subjects in the National Entrance Examination. In 1991, Lu Qiang, a Yaohua student, won the gold medal in Physics at the 22nd International Middle-School-Student Olympic Competition. In the last five years more than 500 students won first, second and third places in Tianjin at the National High-School-Student Competition in Mathematics, Physics, Chemistry, Biology, English and Computer Science; 100 students won first, second and third places in the National High-School-Student Olympic Competition in other subjects.

Teaching staff 
In the 1930s and 1940s, Qian Weichang, a prominent Chinese physicist and Zhang Xiaohu, a noted music theoretician taught here. At present, there are 146 teaching staff. Ten of them are 'Super Degree teachers' and 76 of them have 'Senior Degrees'. There are 61 classes, 11 of which are experimental classes. 3,009 students are enrolled at the school, of whom 495 are in the experimental classes.

At the start of the 21st century, the municipal government and the Municipal Committee of the CCP emphasized repeatedly that more schools should be set up following the example of Nankai High School and Yaohua High School.

The staff are guided by the late Chinese leader Deng Xiaoping's idea that "Education must meet the needs of modernization and face the world and the future" and by CCP general secretary Jiang Zemin's Three Represents (Simplified Chinese: 三个代表) theory.

Current administrators 
 Principal Qu Limin

Mrs. Qu Limin, (born March 1947). Started work at Yaohua High School in May 1974 and graduated from the Department of Mathematics of Tianjin Normal University as a Bachelor of Science. In June, 1986 Mrs. Qu joined the Communist Party of China. During nearly 30 years of teaching in Yaohua she worked successively as a mathematics teacher, a head teacher, and was later appointed director of the Experimental Class for gifted students. In 1992 she was appointed deputy principal of the school directing teaching and research.

In 1998 she was placed in charge of the daily work of the school. Mrs. Qu was formally appointed principal of Yahohua High School in 2000. Mrs. Qu has won many honours at different levels, such as Excellent Party member of Heping District, Excellent Teacher of Heping District and Excellent Educator of Heping District. She also has published research papers, in newspapers and magazines and at meetings.

Quotation: "For a teacher, success means creating a person of whom he is proud, while for a school, success means that the school has cultivated a person who is respected by society."

 Secretary of the CCP branch Bian Hua

Mr. Bian Hua (born  March, 1957), became a member of the CCP in 1978. He read History at Tianjin Normal University and was awarded a bachelor's degree. He transferred to Yaohua High School in March, 2002. Mr. Bian has experience in the army and worked successively in factories and in the educational organizations of the Tianjin Municipality. He was once honoured as an  Excellent Shock Worker.

Quotation: I hope that the students will always work hard bearing the school motto in mind. Also students must always remember that they are working for the purpose of serving our motherland worthily in the future.

 Deputy Principal Ren Yiyi

Mrs. Ren (born in Jan, 1961) started work in 1983. She joined the Communist Party of China in Jan, 1998. She took her Bachelor of Science after she studied in the Mathematics Department of Tianjin Normal University from 1979 to 1983. During 1991 to 1993, she studied in Hiroshima University in Japan appointed by the then State Education Commission (the Ministry of Education now), and then she came back to continue to work in Yaohua. In 2001, she was selected into the first group of the backbone principals of middle schools of China and was sent to attend a three-month training course at the University of Michigan. Mrs. Ren worked successively as a Mathematics teacher, head teacher, head of the teacher group of a grade, etc. In 1998 she was appointed deputy principal in charge of teaching for the school. She was once honoured as a Model Teacher by the then State Education Commission, and in 1996 she was given the honour as (one of the) Top-ten Excellent Teachers of Tianjin.

Quotations: My career goals are the same as those of every staff member in Yaohua. We have been striving for --
 thoroughly understanding the students' thinking and feelings;
 skillful teaching;
 working as researchers of educational theories;
 continually improving the current teaching methods.

 Deputy Principal Zhao Zhongkai

Mr. Zhao (born in Oct, 1944), graduated from the Department of Physics of Beijing University in 1968. He has been teaching physics in high schools over 30 years. He worked successively as head teacher and head of the physics group. He has delivered lectures broadcast on the  Tianjin Television Station and Tianjin Broadcasting Station. He has completed research projects hosted by the State Ministry of Education and published research papers. He has been honoured as a Renowned Teacher of Heping District, Tianjin, Model Teacher of Tianjin, and Excellent Science Instructor of Tianjin. In 1994 he won the prize 'Sewing the Sun' and was awarded Teacher of super Degree by the People's Government Of Tianjin. He is now a consulting committee member of the Tianjin Education Research Center and a standing director of the Tianjin Physics Society.

Quotation: Teaching doesn't merely mean passing on some skills but, in fact, means the art of stimulating, arousing and encouraging the young.

 Deputy Principal Yang Zhikai

Mr. Yang (born in July, 1955). He started work in Sept, 1974. In 1982 Mr. Yang graduated from the Department of Chemistry of Tianjin Normal University. He successively worked as a head teacher, head of different grade, and deputy director of the Teaching Affairs Office. In Feb, 1998 Mr. Yang was appointed Deputy Principal of Yaohua High School. In 1999 Mr. Yang went to Xinjiang Uygur Autonomous Region to support the education there. During 1999 to 2000 he worked as Deputy Principal and member of the Party committee of No. 2 High School of Kashi. He was honored as an Excellent Cardre to Support Xinjiang respectively by the local government of Karshi Prefecture, the government of the Xinjiang Uygur Autonomous Region and the Municipal government of Tianjin.

Quotation: Accumulation is important in learning things. As well as the accumulation of knowledge, accumulation includes the accumulation of methods of study.

Philosophy 
 To prepare students for successful, productive lives through effective educational methods.
 To raise awareness, instill an eagerness to learn and promote diligence.
 To develop the school continuously, help the students develop in an all-round way, and help the teachers to achieve their own goals.
 Success as a teacher is to train students to become people whom they're proud of.
 Success as a principal is to build a school with great vitality.
 Success as a school is to prepare students to make great contributions to mankind.

International Relations 
Yaohua High School has friendly and cooperative relations with many schools abroad, such as a women's college in Hakodate, Japan, as well as high schools in Taiwan, Melbourne, Australia and Nagasaki, Japan. International interactive programs include educational group exchanges and non-governmental delegation visits. Yaohua has sent 20 students to Singapore to for further studies. The school also has ongoing exchange programs with Lock Haven University of Pennsylvania.

External links 

 Official site in English
 Official site in Simplified Chinese
 Students' homepage for grade 2000
 Alumni @ ChinaRen.com

High schools in Tianjin
Educational institutions established in 1927
1927 establishments in China